Zenobia Kloppers (born 10 December 1974) is a Namibian actress, soprano, and writer. Based in South Africa, she starred in the titular role in the film Fiela se Kind. On television, she appeared in Amaza, Suidooster, and Arendsvlei.

Early life
Kloppers is from an academic family in Khomasdal, a suburb of Windhoek, Namibia. She has two younger brothers. She attended Gammams Primary School, the Holy Cross Convent where she discovered acting, and completed her secondary education at St. Paul's College.

Kloppers is a graduate of Stellenbosch University with a Performers Licentiate in Music, Physical Theatre & Movement. Apart from that, she received a Performers Diploma in Acting from the University of Cape Town.

Career
She started her acting career in 1991 with extensive performances in theatre plays such as: Ghoema, Sarah: Saartjie Baartman, Fiela se Kind and Kô, Lat Ons Sing!. She joined with Cape Town station and worked as a radio artist in Radio Sonder Grense (RSG) 100-104FM. During this period, she rendered her voice in many radio plays such as; Boemerang, Poppie - Die Drama, Kuspad, Inferno, Purgatoria, Huis op die Hawe and Stoom. In 2008, she played the role "Fiela" in the stage play Fiela se Kind directed by Sandra Prinsloo.

In 2013, she made television acting debut with the 2013 kykNET adventure series Thomas@TV-reeks, where she played the role as "Joey the Bergie". Then in 2014, she appeared in the SABC1 coming-of-age youth drama series Amaza with the recurring role of "Fatima Ibrahim". In 2019, she made the titular role in the blockbuster feature film Fiela se Kind directed by Brett Michael-Innes. For her role in the film, she won the Award for the Best Actress at the 2020 South African Independent Film Festival. Apart from that, she received nominations for the Best Actress at the 2020 Africa Movie Academy Awards, the 2020 South African Film and Television Awards (SAFTAs) and the 2019 kykNET Silwerskermfees. In the same year, she appeared in two television serials: as "Rebecca Thuli" in the fourth season of kykNET soap opera Suidooster. After the popularity, she reprised her role the following two seasons as well and then as "Emily" in the second season kykNET & kie soap opera Arendsvlei.

In 2020, she made the guest role of "Margie" in the kykNET drama series Projek Dina. In the same year, she joined with the third season of kykNET drama Sara se Geheim and played the role "Tristana". In 2021, she appeared in the SABC2 telenovela Die Sentrum with the role "Lucinda Jackson". Apart from theatre and television, she also acted in some feature films such as; The Endless River, Noem My Skollie, Bhai's Café and Fiela se Kind.

Filmography

References

External links
 
 Zenobia Kloppers at TVSA

1974 births
Living people
Coloured Namibian people
Namibian actors
People from Khomas Region